This page gathers the results of elections in Apulia.

Regional elections

Latest regional election

In the latest regional election, which took place on 20–21 September 2020, Michele Emiliano of the Democratic Party was re-elected President with 46.8% of the vote.

List of previous regional elections
1970 Apulian regional election
1975 Apulian regional election
1980 Apulian regional election
1985 Apulian regional election
1990 Apulian regional election
1995 Apulian regional election
2000 Apulian regional election
2005 Apulian regional election
2010 Apulian regional election
2015 Apulian regional election

References

 
Politics of Apulia